Igor Yuryevich Ivanov (born 19 May 1954) is a Soviet and Russian actor of theater and director. 
He is a People's Artist of Russia (2004).

Education and work 
Igor Ivanov graduated 1979 from the Leningrad State Institute of Theatre Music and Cinematography from Katsman's and Dodin's class.

He acted with the Tomsk Young Viewers' Theatre from 1979 till 1980. During the same year became an actor with the well-known Maly Drama Theatre in Saint Petersburg – where he works to this day.

Since 2010 he has lived and worked in Berlin part-time.

Awards 
 2004 – People's Artist of Russia – Honorary Title for Life Achievement in the field of Acting
 2003 – The Golden Soffit – Award for Male Leading Role in Theatre
 2003 – Strezhelchik Award – Award for Life Achievement in Theatre
 2002 – The International Stanislavski Award of the Russian Federation – Award for Male Leading Role in Theatre
 1991 – Honored Artist RSFSR

Selected work in theatre 
 Intrigue and Love, President Walter – MDT – Theatre de l'Europe, Lev Dodin
 Long Journey into the night, James Tyron – MDT – Theatre de l'Europe, Lev Dodin
 Life and Fate, Mostovskoy – MDT – Theatre de l'Europe, Lev Dodin
 Love's Labors's lost, Don Adriano de Armado – MDT – Theatre de l'Europe, Lev Dodin
 Uncle Vanya, Alexander Serebrjakov – MDT – Theatre de l'Europe, Lev Dodin
 The Cherry Orchard, Lopachin – MDT – Theatre de l'Europe, Lev Dodin
 The Disappearance, Baruch Najleben – MDT – Theatre de l'Europe, Jurij  Kordonski
 The Broken Jug, Consultant Walter – MDT – Theatre de l'Europe, Benjamin Felshtinski
 Desire Under The Elms, Simon – MDT – Theatre de l'Europe, Lev Dodin
 Devils, Captain Lebyadkin – MDT – Theatre de l'Europe, Lev Dodin
 Fiesta, Bill Gorton – MDT – Theatre de l'Europe, Efim Padve
 Brothers and Sisters, Piotr Zhitov – MDT – Theatre de l'Europe, Lev Dodin
 Stars on the Morningsky, Nikolai – MDT – Theatre de l'Europe – Lev Dodin
 The House, Jegorsha – MDT – Theatre de l'Europe – Lev Dodin

Selected work in film

External links 
 Official website of actor and director Igor Ivanov
 IMDB-Site

1954 births
Living people
Male actors from Saint Petersburg
Soviet male film actors
Soviet male television actors
Soviet male stage actors
Russian male film actors
Russian male television actors
Russian male stage actors
Honored Artists of the RSFSR
People's Artists of Russia
Russian State Institute of Performing Arts alumni